Sabir Hussain (born 15 March 1983) is a Pakistani first-class cricketer who played for Quetta cricket team.

References

External links
 

1983 births
Living people
Pakistani cricketers
Quetta cricketers
Cricketers from Quetta